The Johnson Lake Mine is a former tungsten mine located within the boundaries of Great Basin National Park in eastern Nevada. Located on the east slope of the southern Snake Range at an elevation above , the  historic district was listed on the National Register of Historic Places in 1995.

History
The lake and mine are named for Alfred Johnson, who filed a mining claim in Snake Creek Canyon in 1909. A rancher who also wished to exploit the location opposed him in court, but Johnson prevailed. Tungsten was discovered in the area in 1912 by John D. Tilford. Tilford  set up the Bonita Mine, while Johnson set up the Johnson Lake Mine in 1912. The mine was finally closed when a snowslide destroyed the aerial tram terminal after 1935.

Description
The district includes a mining adit and stope, an aerial tramway, four log structures, a log ore mill, a stable, trash dumps and a dam on Johnson Lake. Three cabins were built for accommodations, three small cabins for sleeping and storage, and a larger communal cabin. There is also evidence of tent platforms. The site is well preserved, with some of the mining equipment intact. The milled ore was then packed  to the location of the present Shoshone Campground and further transferred  to Garrison, Utah. From Garrison the ore went  to the railroad at Frisco, Utah.

References

External links

 Johnson Lake Mining District at Great Basin National Park

Mines in Nevada
Historic districts on the National Register of Historic Places in Nevada
Industrial buildings and structures on the National Register of Historic Places in Nevada
Tungsten mines in the United States
Underground mines in the United States
National Register of Historic Places in Great Basin National Park